Phtheochroa variolosana is a species of moth of the family Tortricidae. It is found in western Turkestan, Central Asia, Afghanistan and Iran.

References

Moths described in 1887
Phtheochroa